Po is a word that precedes and signals a provocation. A provocation is an idea which moves thinking forward to a new place from where new ideas or solutions may be found.

Etymology 
The term po was created by Edward de Bono as part of a lateral thinking technique to suggest forward movement, that is, making a statement and seeing where it leads to. It is an extraction from words such as hypothesis, suppose, possible and poetry, all of which indicate forward movement and contain the syllable "po." Po can be taken to refer to any of the following: provoking operation, provocative operation or provocation operation. Also, in Maori, the word "po" refers to the original chaotic state of formlessness, from which evolution occurred. Edward de Bono argues that this context as well applies to the term.

Usage

Initiating a proposal 
For example, in response to "sales are dropping off because our product is perceived as old fashioned":
 po: Change the colour of the packaging
 po: Flood the market with even older-looking products to make it seem more appealing
 po: Call it retro
 po: Sell it to old people
 po: Sell it to young people as a gift for old people
 po: Open a museum dedicated to it
 po: Market it as a new product

Some of the above ideas may be impractical, not sensible or not business-minded. The value of these ideas is that they move thinking from a place where it is entrenched to a place where it can move.

The above ideas might develop into:

The point of these examples is that an initial po may seem silly, but a further development may seem very good indeed. The intermediate silly idea is a necessary step to find the good idea. If silly ideas are not allowed to form, the subsequent good idea will be undiscovered. Po allows silly ideas to form so that good ones can follow.

As an interjection 
Po is also an interjection, considered as an alternative to yes or no. Indicating that you need to know more before answering an expression of an idea or thought. Imagine it as a word that means: "I think I know what you mean, but can you say it in another way so I may more fully understand you". Its use indicates respect for the other.

Po is used as a term of self discovery when used in connection with the "color corrected" co-creation wheel of Barbara Marx Hubbard.

References

Sources 

 Edward de Bono. The Mechanism of Mind (1969). , introduced the term po in chapter 34, The New Functional Word
 Edward de Bono. Po: A Device for Successful Thinking (1972). 
 Edward de Bono. Po: Beyond Yes and No (1973). 
 Edward de Bono. Serious Creativity (1992). 

Reasoning
Jargon
Group problem solving methods
Creativity techniques